Carijona are a South American indigenous group known for the Carijona language. They numbered in the thousands in the 1840s, but war with the Witotoans and exploitation from the rubber industry led to virtual extinction. Some live among the Correguaje, while descendants of an Afro-Colombian named Salvador Perea and a Carijona woman also survived.

References 

Indigenous peoples in Colombia